The 2019 Chevrolet Silverado 250 is a NASCAR Gander Outdoors Truck Series race held on August 25, 2019, at Canadian Tire Motorsport Park in Bowmanville, Ontario, Canada. Contested over 64 laps on the  road course, it was the 18th race of the 2019 NASCAR Gander Outdoors Truck Series season, second race of the Playoffs, and the second race of the Round of 8.

Background

Track

Canadian Tire Motorsport Park is a multi-track motorsport venue located north of Bowmanville, in Ontario, Canada. The name "Mosport" is a portmanteau of Motor Sport, came from the enterprise formed to build the track.

Entry list

Practice

First practice

Final practice

Qualifying

Qualifying results

. – Playoffs driver

Race

Summary
Brett Moffitt started on pole and dominated the first stage, winning it after leading all of the laps. Todd Gilliland spun during stage 1, but pitted and managed to stay on the lead lap. Johnny Sauter and Grant Enfinger made contact, sending Enfinger spinning, though he was able to prevent his truck from hitting the wall. On lap 31, Dan Corcoran spun and wrecked. Ross Chastain stayed out during the caution and won Stage 2.

After Stage 2 pit stops, Moffitt regained the lead after jumping ahead of Alex Tagliani. Moffitt was able to win his second consecutive race with a 5-second lead over Tagliani.

Stage Results

Stage One
Laps: 20

Stage Two
Laps: 20

Final Stage Results

Stage Three
Laps: 24

. – Playoffs driver

Notes

References

Chevrolet Silverado 250
Chevrolet Silverado 250
NASCAR races at Canadian Tire Motorsport Park
Chevrolet Silverado 250